Myllaena is a genus of rove beetles in the family Staphylinidae. There are more than 60 described species in Myllaena.

Species
These 66 species belong to the genus Myllaena:

 Centroglossa conuroides Matthews, 1838
 Myllaena apetina Sharp, 1908
 Myllaena arcana Casey, 1911
 Myllaena audax Casey, 1911
 Myllaena brasiliensis Caron & Klimaszewski, 2008
 Myllaena brevicollis Casey, 1911
 Myllaena brevicornis (Matthews, 1838)
 Myllaena cognata Sharp, 1908
 Myllaena cornelli Pace, 1997
 Myllaena cuneata Notman, 1920
 Myllaena currax Notman, 1920
 Myllaena curtipes Sharp, 1880
 Myllaena debilicornis Sharp, 1883
 Myllaena decreta Casey, 1911
 Myllaena dinahae Klimaszewski, 1992
 Myllaena discedens Sharp, 1880
 Myllaena dubia (Gravenhorst, 1806)
 Myllaena elongata (Matthews, 1838)
 Myllaena esuriens Casey
 Myllaena familiaris Sharp, 1880
 Myllaena fenyesi Bernhauer, 1907
 Myllaena fragilis Sharp, 1883
 Myllaena frivola Casey
 Myllaena gourvesi Coiffait, 1976
 Myllaena gracilis (Matthews, 1838)
 Myllaena graeca Kraatz, 1858
 Myllaena guadalupensis Pace, 1987
 Myllaena haleakalae Sharp, 1908
 Myllaena hopi Klimaszewski, 1982
 Myllaena hopkinton Klimaszewski, 1982
 Myllaena hyperborea Strand, 1943
 Myllaena impellens Casey
 Myllaena infuscata Kraatz, 1853
 Myllaena insipiens Casey, 1911
 Myllaena insomnis Casey, 1911
 Myllaena insularis Fenyes
 Myllaena intermedia Erichson, 1837
 Myllaena kaskaskia Klimaszewski, 1982
 Myllaena koasati Klimaszewski, 1982
 Myllaena kraatzi Sharp, 1871
 Myllaena ludificans Casey, 1911
 Myllaena magnicollis Cameron
 Myllaena magnolia Klimaszewski, 1982
 Myllaena masoni Matthews, 1883
 Myllaena minuta (Gravenhorst, 1806)
 Myllaena mollis Sharp, 1883
 Myllaena neozelandensis Pace, 2008
 Myllaena nivium Pace, 1984
 Myllaena numeensis Pace, 1991
 Myllaena oahuensis Blackburn, 1885
 Myllaena obtusa Sharp, 1883
 Myllaena oxypodina Sharp, 1908
 Myllaena pacifica Sharp, 1880
 Myllaena potawatomi Klimaszewski, 1982
 Myllaena procidua Casey, 1911
 Myllaena pubescens Last, 1966
 Myllaena reunionensis Pace, 1984
 Myllaena robusta Sharp, 1883
 Myllaena rufescens Sharp, 1908
 Myllaena schauenbergi Pace, 1984
 Myllaena seminole Klimaszewski, 1982
 Myllaena serrano Klimaszewski, 1982
 Myllaena tangarakauensis Pace, 2015
 Myllaena tenuicornis Fauvel, 1900
 Myllaena vicina Sharp, 1880
 Myllaena vulpina Bernhauer, 1907

References

Further reading

External links

 

Aleocharinae
Articles created by Qbugbot